1. FC Normannia Gmünd is a German association football club from the city of Schwäbisch Gmünd, Baden-Württemberg.

History

The origins of the club go back to the formation of Alemannia Schwäbisch Gmünd on 29 July 1904. This side later merged with Suevia Schwäbisch Gmünd to form 1. FC Normannia. The club managed to reach the tier-one Bezirksliga Württemberg in 1932 and played at this level for one season, before the league was dissolved.

Normannia took part in second division competition for two seasons in 1942–44 before advancing to the Gauliga Württemberg (I) where they played in the war-shortened 1944–45 season. The club returned to second division play after World War II in 1947 in the Landesliga Württemberg, later the Amateurliga Württemberg, where they would remain until sent down in 1955.

In 1965 they re-emerged in the Amateurliga Nordwürttemberg (III), capturing the division title, and then taking part in the promotion round playoff for the Regionaliga Süd (II). However, they were unable to advance and spent most of the next ten years in the Amateurliga before slipping to lower-tier competition in 1975. In 1972 Normannia enjoyed a solid run in the national amateur championship, going as far as the semi-finals before being put out by FSV Frankfurt. A regional cup win in 1977 earned the team a place in the 1978 DFB Pokal (German Cup) tournament. They eliminated second division side Fortuna Köln before being eliminated themselves by the second team squad of FC Augsburg.

After winning the Verbandsliga Württemberg in 2004, the 1. FC played in the Oberliga Baden-Württemberg (IV) as a lower table side until 2012 when it was relegated again.

Honours

The club's honours:

League
 Verbandsliga Württemberg
 Champions: 2004

Cup
 Württemberg Cup
 Winners: 1977, 2007

Recent managers
Recent managers of the club:

Recent seasons

The recent season-by-season performance of the club:

 With the introduction of the Regionalligas in 1994 and the 3. Liga in 2008 as the new third tier, below the 2. Bundesliga, all leagues below dropped one tier.

References

Sources
Grüne, Hardy (2001). Vereinslexikon. Kassel: AGON Sportverlag

External links
Official team site
Das deutsche Fußball-Archiv historical German domestic league tables 
1. FC Normannia Schwäbisch Gmünd at fussball.de

 
Football clubs in Germany
Football clubs in Baden-Württemberg
Association football clubs established in 1904
1904 establishments in Germany